Marianne J. Legato, MD, PhD (hon c), FACP, is an American internationally-known academic physician, author, and lecturer and globally recognized expert in gender-specific medicine, the science of how normal humans function and how the experience of the same disease vary as a function of gender/biological sex.

Legato is an expert on the sex-specific aspects of men's and women's health and is the founder and director of the Partnership for Gender-Specific Medicine at Columbia University. In 2008, she established the non-profit Foundation for Gender-Specific Medicine. She has devoted much of her research to the subject of women and heart disease and in 1992 won the American Heart Association's Blakeslee Award for writing the best book on cardiovascular disease written for the lay public.

Legato is the founder and editor of The Journal of Gender-Specific Medicine and of Gender-Medicine  and a leading advocate for the inclusion of women in clinical trials. She is annually cited in New York Magazine's top doctors issues. She is also the author of bestselling Why Men Die First: How to Lengthen Your Lifespan, Eve's Rib:The New Science of Gender-Specific Medicine and How It Can Save Your Life, The Female Heart, and Why Men Never Remember and Women Never Forget, which was translated into eleven languages. She edited the medical textbook, Principles of Gender-Specific Medicine, the first compilation for professional audiences of the sex-specific aspects of normal human function and disease. The third edition of Principles of Gender-Specific Medicine won a PROSE Award from the Association of American Publishers in 2018. Her latest textbook, The Plasticity of Sex, won a PROSE Award in 2021.

Legato has been an invited speaker at lectures and conferences throughout the United States and around the world. She has been featured on the national ABC program 20/20 in a segment dealing with gender prejudice in women's health care and has made multiple appearances on local and national television and radio programs, including NBC's Good Morning America, Good Day New York, the Joan Hamburg Show, The Today Show, Lifetime TV, Iyanla Show, The Larry King Show and The Oprah Winfrey Show.

Legato has been an invited speaker at hundreds of lectures and conferences throughout the world for over a decade. Most recently, she was the president of the First International Congress on Gender-Specific Medicine in Berlin, Germany (February 2006) and is the honorary president of the next two International Congresses on Gender-Specific Medicine in Vienna (2007) and Stockholm (2008).

Childhood and early career
Marianne J. Legato was born in 1935, in New York. She grew up accompanying her father, a general practitioner, on house calls and hospital rounds, and knew by the age of three that she wanted to follow him into a career in medicine. Although he had high expectations for his daughter, her father was anxious to protect her and opposed her decision to go to medical school. She enrolled at his alma mater, New York University College of Medicine, but could not persuade him to allow her to have her independence and a career in medicine.

Legato began her career without the support of her family. She credits her success in medical school and after graduation to the mentorship of José Ferrer and M. Irené Ferrer (siblings of Mel Ferrer), whom she met at the Columbia University College of Physicians and Surgeons. M. Irené Ferrer even visited the dean of New York University College of Medicine to arrange for Legato to complete her education there, personally paying her tuition fees. Legato has two children, Christiana and Justin, who have grown up as part of Ferrer's extended family and knew her as "gran".

Professional career
After graduating from medical school in 1962, Legato completed an internship and junior residency at Bellevue Hospital and a senior residency at the Presbyterian Hospital of the City of New York. From 1965 to 1968 , she was a visiting fellow in cardiology at the Columbia University College of Physicians and Surgeons, and in 1968, she was appointed instructor in medicine, beginning an academic career at Columbia University College of Physicians & Surgeons, where she currently holds the position of Professor of Clinical Medicine. She is a Fellow of the American College of Physicians and a Diplomate of the American Board of Internal Medicine.

Since 1969, Legato has been an attending physician at St. Luke's-Roosevelt Hospital Center, and since 1973 at the Presbyterian Hospital in the City of New York. She is currently senior attending physician at St. Luke's-Roosevelt and has been a senior attending physician at the Presbyterian Hospital since 1998. She has held several teaching appointments and committee memberships at both institutions, and in 1997 founded the Partnership for Gender-Specific Medicine at Columbia University College of Physicians and Surgeons.

As director of the Partnership, Legato promoted collaboration between academic medicine and the private sector to generate research on the differences between men and women. Her mission is to ensure the inclusion of women in clinical trials of relevance to the health of both sexes, to promote the study of differences in the biology of men and women and how gender affects the diagnosis and treatment of disease, for the benefit of all patients. The Partnership for Gender-Specific Medicine is raising funds for the M. Irené Ferrer Professorship in Gender-Specific Medicine at Columbia University.

The Foundation for Gender-Specific Medicine 

By the early 1990s, women began directly participating in clinical trials, leading to the start of gender-specific medicine. 

Mission

To use the study of gender to foster the development of new sciences and improve health care for all patients: The Foundation for Gender Specific-Medicine supports the investigation of the ways in which biological sex and gender affect normal human function and the experience of disease.

Purpose

1. Support original scientific research in gender-specific medicine: Each year, the Foundation provides fellowships to untenured, young faculty members with the goal of fostering their interest in gender-specific medicine at the beginning of their investigative careers.

2. Create an evidence-based set of protocols to guide physicians: The Foundation is working to assemble a critical mass of evidence-based criteria for optimal gender-specific treatment within each specialty of medicine. We have finished recommendations for gender-specific care of diabetics and are currently working on cardiovascular disease.

3. Education of the lay public and the scientific/medical community: The Foundation understands that science does not operate outside of the rest of society, and we consider education a central part of our mission. The interests of the lay public drive medical research and practice. Rather than simply serving as an informational vehicle, the Foundation creates an open dialogue between patients and the medical community.

Recognition
Legato has won professional recognition for her work, including the Martha Lyon Slater Fellowship from 1965 to 1968 and in 1971, the J. Murray Steele Award, both from the New York Heart Association. Her research career, which defined the structure and function of the myocardial cell, was supported by a Research Career Development Award from the National Institutes of Health and by research grants from the National Heart, Lung, and Blood Institute of the National Institutes of Health. She has served on study sections to review applications for NIH grants at the National Heart Lung and Blood Institute. She was a charter member of the advisory board (1995–1998) to the newly created Office of Research in Women's Health of the NIH. There she was co-chair of the Task Force convened to set the research agenda on women's health for the 21st century.

In 1992, Legato won the American Heart Association's Blakeslee Award for the best book written for the lay public on cardiovascular disease with her publication of The Female Heart: The Truth About Women and Heart Disease, published by Simon & Schuster. Her film, Shattering the Myths: Women and Heart Disease won a “Freddy”, a first prize in the category of Women's Health at The 1995 International Health and Medical Film Festival.

She was named an "American Health Hero" by American Health for Women in 1997 and received the Women's Medical Society of New York's annual Woman in Science Award in 1997. In the Fall of 2000, Ladies Home Journal honored Legato as a “Heroine of Women’s Health”.  She has been consecutively cited as one of New York's best doctors by New York Magazine, for the past 12 years, most recently in 2009.

In 2002 she received the Woman in Science Award from the American Medical Women's Association.  She has been listed in the June 1994 issue of Mirabella magazine's "1,000 Women for the 1990s", and inclusion in the New York Times list of twelve health care professionals accomplished in the area of women's health in June 1997.

She was one of 300 American physicians included in the National Library of Medicine's documentary, Changing the Face of Medicine in 2004. In 2005, she received the National Council on Women's Health Award for distinguished service in gender-specific medicine. In 2006, the Ladies' Home Journal established an annual Marianne J. Legato Award in Gender-Specific Medicine in her honor.

Legato was awarded an honorary PhD from the University of Panama in 2015 for her work on the differences between men and women.

In 2018, Legato won a PROSE Award from the Association of American Publishers for the best book on clinical medicine for her publication of Principles of Gender-Specific Medicine: Gender in the Genomic Era (Third Edition). In 2021, she won a PROSE Award in the category of Biomedicine for her book The Plasticity of Sex: The Molecular Biology and Clinical Features of Genomic Sex, Gender Identity and Sexual Behavior.

References

External links 
https://web.archive.org/web/20090805151516/http://partnership.hs.columbia.edu/legato.html
 http://www.gendermed.org

American cardiologists
Women cardiologists
American medical writers
Women medical writers
Living people
1935 births
American women physicians
21st-century American women